Alan Ledesma may refer to:

 Alan Ledesma (actor) (1977–2008), Mexican actor
 Alan Ledesma (footballer) (born 1998), Argentine footballer